The Newhalen River (Dena'ina: Nughiltnu) is a  stream in the Lake and Peninsula Borough of the U.S. state of Alaska.

Alaska Fishing describes the river as "the major pathway for a mind-boggling migration of sockeye salmon" that ascend the stream in early summer. The main game fish in addition to sockeye are rainbow trout.

It is possible to float parts of the Newhalen in rafts and kayaks. However, waterfalls rated Class V (extremely difficult) on the International Scale of River Difficulty and other sections of whitewater rated Class IV (very difficult) mean that the river "is rarely run in its entirety". More difficult water begins below Upper Landing.

See also
List of rivers of Alaska

References

Rivers of Lake and Peninsula Borough, Alaska
Rivers of Alaska